Midori Dam  is a rockfill dam located in Hokkaido Prefecture in Japan. The dam is used for irrigation. The catchment area of the dam is 20.3 km2. The dam impounds about 53  ha of land when full and can store 7100 thousand cubic meters of water. The construction of the dam was started on 1974 and completed in 2003.

References

Dams in Hokkaido